Davod may refer to:

Places
Dávod, a village in southern Hungary

People
Davood Azad (born 1963), Iranian composer, Sufi vocalist
Davoud Rashidi (1933–2016), Iranian actor
Davod Reeves, musician on Fat Boys
Davod Rosemann-Taub, Chilean-Jewish writer
Davod Aur Edeyrn (fl. 1270), Welsh bard and grammarian